Scopula isomala is a moth of the  family Geometridae. It is found in Kenya and Malawi.

References

Moths described in 1932
Taxa named by Louis Beethoven Prout
isomala
Moths of Africa